Giulio Vitelli was a Roman Catholic prelate who served as Bishop of Città di Castello (1499–1503).

Biography
On 7 April 1499, Giulio Vitelli  was appointed by Pope Alexander VI as Bishop of Città di Castello. He served as Bishop of Città di Castello until his resignation in 1503.

References

External links and additional sources
 (for Chronology of Bishops) 
 (for Chronology of Bishops) 

15th-century Italian Roman Catholic bishops
Bishops appointed by Pope Alexander VI
Giulio
16th-century Italian Roman Catholic bishops